Holvar and Holver may refer to:
 Holvar-e Olya
 Holvar-e Sofla